The discography of the Lost Boyz contains three studio albums, seven singles and one compilation album.

Studio albums

Compilation

Singles

References

Hip hop discographies
Discographies of American artists